The 62nd Evening Standard Theatre Awards were awarded, on 13 November 2016 at The Old Vic, in recognition of the 2016–17 London Theatre season. Nominations for the Radio 2 Audience Award for Best Musical were announced in October 2016, followed by the full list of nominations in November 2016. The ceremony was presented by Rob Brydon and co-hosted by Elton John and Evgeny Lebedev.

Eligibility and nominators 
Shows were eligible if they opened in London between 22 November 2015 and 30 September 2016.

The advisory judging panel comprised Daily Mail columnist Baz Bamigboye, WhatsOnStage writer Sarah Crompton, Evening Standard chief theatre critic Henry Hitchings, The Guardian culture writer and broadcaster Mark Lawson, Evening Standard editor Sarah Sands and New York Times International London theatre critic Matt Wolf.

Ceremony

Presenters 

 Eileen Atkins presented Best Revival
 James McAvoy presented the Natasha Richardson Award for Best Actress

Performances 

 Elton John and the cast of The Lion King performed "Circle of Life"
 Amber Riley performed "And I Am Telling You I'm Not Going" from Dreamgirls

Sponsors 
Burberry, Christian Louboutin and Hiscox were partners of the event, the latter of which was the official arts partner.

The following awards were presented in partnership:

 Best Play was awarded in partnership with Hiscox
 Emerging Talent was awarded in partnership with Burberry

Non-competitive awards 
The Beyond Theatre Award was awarded to David Attenborough for his contribution to broadcasting.

The Editor's Award was awarded to Good Chance Theatre.

The Lebedev Award was awarded to Kenneth Branagh in recognition of his plays at the Garrick Theatre.

Winners and nominees 
{| class="wikitable"
!Best Play
!Best Revival
|-
|
 Harry Potter and the Cursed Child by J. K. Rowling, Jack Thorne and John Tiffany, Palace Theatre Father Comes Home From The Wars (Parts 1, 2 and 3) by Suzan-Lori Parks, Royal Court Theatre
 The Flick by Annie Baker, National Theatre Dorfman
|
 No Man's Land, Wyndham's Theatre Les Blancs, National Theatre Olivier
 Ma Rainey's Black Bottom, National Theatre Lyttelton
 Young Chekhov: Platonov, Ivanov and The Seagull, Chichester Festival Theatre and National Theatre Olivier
|-
!Best Actor
!Natasha Richardson Award for Best Actress|-
|
 Ralph Fiennes, The Master Builder/Richard III, The Old Vic/Almeida Theatre Kenneth Branagh, The Entertainer, Garrick Theatre
 O. T. Fagbenle, Ma Rainey's Black Bottom, National Theatre Lyttelton 
 James McArdle, Platonov, Chichester Festival Theatre and National Theatre Olivier
 Ian McKellen, No Man's Land, Wyndham's Theatre
|
 Billie Piper, Yerma, Young Vic Noma Dumezweni, Linda, Royal Court Theatre
 Helen McCrory, The Deep Blue Sea, National Theatre Lyttelton
 Sophie Melville, Iphigenia in Splott, National Theatre Temporary Theatre and Sherman Theatre
|-
!Radio 2 Audience Award for Best Musical!Best Musical Performance
|-
|
 Jesus Christ Superstar''', Regent's Park Open Air Theatre Funny Girl, Menier Chocolate Factory and Savoy Theatre
 Groundhog Day, The Old Vic
 Guys and Dolls, Phoenix Theatre and Savoy Theatre
 Our Ladies of Perpetual Succour, National Theatre Dorfman
 Sunset Boulevard, London Coliseum
|
 Glenn Close, Sunset Boulevard, London Coliseum Andy Karl, Groundhog Day, The Old Vic
 Sheridan Smith, Funny Girl, Menier Chocolate Factory and Savoy Theatre
|-
!Milton Shulman Award for Best Director!Best Design
|-
|
 John Malkovich, Good Canary, Rose Theatre Kingston Dominic Cooke, Ma Rainey's Black Bottom, National Theatre Lyttelton
 John Tiffany, Harry Potter and the Cursed Child, Palace Theatre
|
 Gareth Fry and Pete Malkin, The Encounter, Barbican Theatre Jon Bausor, You For Me For You, Royal Court Theatre
 Rob Howell, The Master Builder and Groundhog Day, The Old Vic
|-
!Charles Wintour Award for Most Promising Playwright!Emerging Talent Award
|-
|
 Charlene James, Cuttin’ It, Royal Court Theatre and Young Vic Jon Brittain, Rotterdam, Theatre 503 and Trafalgar Studios
 David Ireland, Cyprus Avenue, Royal Court Theatre
|
 Tyrone Huntley, Jesus Christ Superstar, Regent's Park Open Air Theatre Jaygann Ayeh, The Flick, National Theatre Dorfman
 Anthony Boyle, Harry Potter and the Cursed Child, Palace Theatre
 Aoife Duffin, A Girl is a Half-formed Thing/The Taming Of The Shrew, Dublin Corn Exchange and Young Vic/Shakespeare's Globe
|}

 Multiple awards 2 awards Jesus Christ Superstar

 Multiple nominations 3 nominations Groundhog Day
 Harry Potter and the Cursed Child
 Ma Rainey's Black Bottom2 nominations' The Flick Funny Girl
 Jesus Christ Superstar The Master Builder No Man's Land Platonov Sunset Boulevard''

See also 

 2015 Laurence Olivier Awards
 2016 Laurence Olivier Awards

References 

Evening Standard Theatre Awards ceremonies
Evening Standard Theatre Awards
Evening Standard Theatre Awards
Evening Standard Theatre Awards